Donald J. Bennett (May 6, 1931 – August 30, 1987) was a United States military officer, politician, and a businessman

Born in Fresno, California, Bennett went to San Jose State University and the University of Maryland. He served in the United States Army and retired as a lieutenant colonel. Bennett lived in Fairbanks, Alaska and was a businessman. He served in the Alaska House of Representatives from 1977 to 1979 and was a Republican. Bennett then served in the Alaska Senate from 1979 until his death. Bennett was president of the senate. Bennett died at Fairbanks Memorial Hospital in Fairbanks, Alaska after suffering a heart attack.

References

1931 births
1987 deaths
Politicians from Fairbanks, Alaska
People from Fresno, California
Military personnel from California
San Jose State University alumni
University System of Maryland alumni
Businesspeople from Fairbanks, Alaska
Republican Party members of the Alaska House of Representatives
Presidents of the Alaska Senate
Republican Party Alaska state senators
Military personnel from Fairbanks, Alaska
20th-century American politicians
20th-century American businesspeople